Cerro Maltusado (Spanish for badly cut mane) is the highest peak of La Peineta arête in the Andes of Los Ríos Region, Chile. The peak has an approximate prominence of about 1425 meters from its base at Riñihue Lake, being close to be an ultra prominent peak.

Mountains of Chile
Mountains of Los Ríos Region